Wild Love is a 1955 Italian drama film directed by Mauro Bolognini. It was entered into the 1956 Cannes Film Festival.

Cast
 Antonella Lualdi as Adriana Latini
 Franco Interlenghi as Franco
 Sergio Raimondi as Nando Latini
 Valeria Moriconi as Marisa
 Nino Manfredi as Otello
 Nadia Bianchi as Alba del Bosco, la diva dei fumetti
 Oscar Blando as Gratta
 Decimo Cristiani as Luciano
 Nino Marino as Aldo
 Alessandra Panaro as Marcella
 Gigi Reder as Annibale
 Toni Ucci (as Tony Ucci)
 Giancarlo Zarfati (as Giancarlo Zarfati)
 Gino Cervi as Cesare Sor
 Cosetta Greco as Ines

References

External links

1955 films
1955 drama films
1950s Italian-language films
Films set in Rome
Films shot in Rome
Italian black-and-white films
Films directed by Mauro Bolognini
Films scored by Carlo Rustichelli
Italian drama films
1950s Italian films